Aleksa Brđović (born July 29, 1993) is a Serbian volleyball player, a member of Serbia men's national volleyball team and Russian club Gazprom-Ugra Surgut, Polish Champion (2014).

Career

Clubs
In 2013 he moved to Polish club PGE Skra Bełchatów. He won a title of Polish Champion 2014 with PGE Skra Bełchatów. On October 8, 2014, his team won ENEA Polish SuperCup 2014. On May 6, 2015, he won with PGE Skra Bełchatów bronze medal of Polish Championship. In May 2015 he left Polish team and went to Russian club Gazprom-Yugra Surgut. He signed two-year contract.

National team
He debuted in Serbian national team in 2012. He was appointed to the team at World League 2014 by coach Igor Kolaković.

Sporting achievements

Clubs

National championships
 2013/2014  Polish Championship, with PGE Skra Bełchatów
 2014/2015  Polish SuperCup2014, with PGE Skra Bełchatów
 2014/2015  Polish Championship, with PGE Skra Bełchatów

National team
 2016  FIVB World League

References

External links 
 PlusLiga profile

1993 births
Living people
Sportspeople from Belgrade
Serbian men's volleyball players
Serbian expatriate sportspeople in Poland
Expatriate volleyball players in Poland
Polish Champions of men's volleyball
Skra Bełchatów players
Serbian expatriate sportspeople in Russia
Expatriate volleyball players in Russia
Volleyball players at the 2010 Summer Youth Olympics